Joseph Nestroy Kizito (born 27 July 1982) is an Ugandan former professional footballer who plays as a defender.

At international level, Kizito represented Uganda from 2001 to 2011, having earned 39 caps to his name.

Club career
In his homeland, Kizito spent four seasons at Villa, helping the club win four consecutive championship titles (2000, 2001, 2002, and 2002–03) and two Uganda Cups (2000 and 2002). He also won the Kagame Interclub Cup in 2003, before moving abroad.

In early 2004, alongside his teammate Phillip Ssozi, Kizito went to Serbia and Montenegro and joined Second League side Srem. He spent the entire year at the club, before earning a transfer to First League side Vojvodina in early 2005. Later that year, Kizito scored the only goal for his team in a 1–0 win over Red Star Belgrade. He thus helped Vojvodina defeat their rival for the first time in 10 years. Due to his consistent performances throughout the 2005–06 season, Kizito was voted the Vojvodina Player of the Season by the club's supporters. He continued to play regularly for the side in the following years, amassing over 100 league appearances. In January 2010, Kizito was demoted from the first team after refusing to extend his contract.

After becoming a free agent, Kizito signed a two-year contract with Partizan on 2 July 2010. He made his debut for the club 19 days later, playing the full 90 minutes in a 1–0 win away against Armenian champions Pyunik in the second leg of the 2010–11 UEFA Champions League second qualifying round. During the 2010–11 Serbian SuperLiga, Kizito recorded 14 appearances, all starts, as the club won the championship title. He also helped his team win the 2010–11 Serbian Cup, thus collecting the double. In October 2011, Kizito terminated his contract with Partizan by mutual agreement.

After returning to his country, Kizito signed for newly promoted Super League side Victoria University in August 2012, penning a one-year deal. He eventually spent the next three years there, before leaving in July 2015. Shortly after, Kizito joined fellow Ugandan club Lweza.

International career
Kizito made his full international debut for Uganda in 2001. He went on to earn a total of 39 caps for the Cranes over the following decade. In February 2012, Kizito announced his retirement from international football.

Personal life
A Tanzanian descendant, Kizito was born in Mutukula, Uganda on the Tanzania–Uganda border. He is the younger brother of Manfred Kizito, who represented Rwanda internationally.

Honours
Villa
 Uganda Super League: 2000, 2001, 2002, 2002–03
 Uganda Cup: 2000, 2002
 Kagame Interclub Cup: 2003
Partizan
 Serbian SuperLiga: 2010–11
 Serbian Cup: 2010–11
Victoria University
 Uganda Cup: 2013

References

External links
 
 
 

Association football defenders
Expatriate footballers in Serbia
FK Partizan players
FK Srem players
FK Vojvodina players
SC Victoria University players
SC Villa players
Serbian SuperLiga players
Uganda international footballers
Uganda Premier League players
Ugandan expatriate footballers
Ugandan expatriate sportspeople in Serbia
Ugandan footballers
1982 births
Living people